The name Dante has been used for five tropical cyclones in the Philippines by PAGASA in the Western Pacific.

 Typhoon Nesat (2005) (T0504, 04W, Dante) – approached Japan
 Typhoon Kujira (2009) (T0901, 01W, Dante) – triggered severe flooding and mudslides which killed 28 people on Luzon
 Tropical Storm Yagi (2013) (T1303, 03W, Dante) – impacted the Philippines and Japan
 Tropical Storm Muifa (2017) (T1701, 03W, Dante) 
 Tropical Storm Choi-wan (2021) (T2103, 04W, Dante) – crossed the Philippines and later affected Taiwan

Pacific typhoon set index articles